Yusuf Shehata (born 16 January 1996) is an Egyptian-American basketball player who plays for Sporting Alexandria of the Egyptian Basketball Super League. He also plays for the Egypt national basketball team, with whom whe appeared at the AfroBasket 2021 tournament.

Born in Tucson, Arizona, Shehata played one season of college basketball for the Bellevue Bruins, and two seasons for the Point Loma Nazarene Sea Lions.

References

External links
Yusuf Shehata at Eurobasket.com

1996 births
Egyptian men's basketball players
Alexandria Sporting Club players
Point guards
Point Loma Nazarene Sea Lions men's basketball players
Basketball players from Tucson, Arizona
Living people